Pectinia is a genus of corals belonging to the family Merulinidae.

Species:

Pectinia africana 
Pectinia alcicornis 
Pectinia crassa 
Pectinia elongata 
Pectinia lactuca 
Pectinia laxa 
Pectinia maxima 
Pectinia paeonia 
Pectinia pygmaea 
Pectinia teres

References

Merulinidae
Scleractinia genera